The Yale Law Journal (YLJ), known also as the Yale Law Review, is a student-run law review affiliated with the Yale Law School. Published continuously since 1891, it is the most widely known of the eight law reviews published by students at Yale Law School. The journal is one of the most cited legal publications in the United States (with an impact factor of 5.000) and usually generates the highest number of citations per published article.

The journal, which is published eight times per year, contains articles, essays, features, and book reviews by professional legal scholars as well as student-written notes and comments. It is edited entirely by students. The journal has an online companion, the Yale Law Journal Forum, which features shorter pieces and responses from scholars, practitioners, and policymakers.

The Yale Law Journal, in conjunction with the Harvard Law Review, the Columbia Law Review, and the University of Pennsylvania Law Review, publishes The Bluebook: A Uniform System of Citation, the most widely followed authority for legal citation formats in the United States.

Admissions
The journal holds a two-part admissions competition each spring, consisting of a "source and citation exam" followed by a traditional writing competition, as well as a recently added diversity statement that is worth 20% of the admissions scoring. Students may also join the staff if they publish a note in the Journal.

Notable alumni
Alumni of the Yale Law Journal have served at all levels of the federal judiciary. Alumni include Supreme Court justices (Samuel Alito, Abe Fortas, Brett Kavanaugh, Sonia Sotomayor, Potter Stewart) and numerous judges on the United States courts of appeals (Duane Benton, Stephanos Bibas, Guido Calabresi, Steven Colloton, Morton Ira Greenberg, Stephen A. Higginson, Andrew D. Hurwitz, Robert Katzmann, Scott Matheson, William J. Nardini, Michael H. Park, Jill A. Pryor, Richard G. Taranto, Patricia Wald, Cory T. Wilson).

Alumni have also served as United States Attorneys General (Nicholas Katzenbach, Peter Keisler) and United States Solicitors General (Walter E. Dellinger III, Neal Katyal, Seth P. Waxman). In addition, numerous editors have gone on to serve as high-ranking public officials (Senator Arlen Specter, Senator Michael Bennet, Senator Richard Blumenthal, former Secretary of Labor Robert Reich, Secretary of Health and Human Services Alex Azar, FBI Director Christopher A. Wray, White House Counsel Lloyd Cutler, National Security Advisor John R. Bolton).

Former editors also include prominent law professors (Matthew Adler, Akhil Amar, Ian Ayres, Barbara A. Babcock, Philip Bobbitt, Stephen L. Carter, Alan Dershowitz, John Hart Ely, Noah Feldman, Claire Finkelstein, Joseph Goldstein, Dawn Johnsen, Randall Kennedy, Karl Llewellyn, Jonathan R. Macey, Charles A. Reich, Reva Siegel, John Yoo, and Kenji Yoshino), as well as the deans of Yale Law School (Robert Post and Louis H. Pollak, who was also dean of the University of Pennsylvania Law School), Harvard Law School (Martha Minow), Columbia Law School (David Schizer), Brooklyn Law School (Joan Wexler), Northwestern University School of Law (David E. Van Zandt, now the president of The New School), Bates College (Clayton Spencer), Michigan Law School (Evan Caminker), New York University School of Law (Richard Revesz), Georgetown Law Center (T. Alexander Aleinikoff), Emory University School of Law (Robert A. Schapiro), Washington and Lee University School of Law (Nora Demleitner), and Stanford Law School (Bayless Manning).

Notable articles
Some of the journal's most cited articles include:

 
 
 
 
 
 
 
 
 
 
 Fiss, Owen (1984). "Against Settlement".  Yale Law Journal. 93 (6): 1073-1090. .

Both Samuel Alito and Sonia Sotomayor  wrote student notes for the Yale Law Journal, which were scrutinized during their nomination processes to the Supreme Court of the United States.

References

Further reading

External links
 
 The Pocket Part

American law journals
General law journals
Yale Law School
Publications established in 1891
Law journals edited by students
1891 establishments in Connecticut
8 times per year journals